Adjacent, Against, Upon is a 1976 sculpture by Michael Heizer, installed in Seattle's Myrtle Edwards Park, in the U.S. state of Washington. The work was the first commissioned by the Seattle Arts Commission. It has been described as "exquisite" and "iconic".

See also 

 1976 in art

References

External links
 Michael Heizer's sculpture Adjacent, Against, Upon is unveiled in Seattle's Myrtle Edwards Park in December 1976, HistoryLink.org

1976 establishments in Washington (state)
1976 sculptures
Outdoor sculptures in Seattle